Funa Nakayama (中山 楓奈, Nakayama Fūna; born 17 June 2005) is a Japanese skateboarder from Toyama City.  Nakayama won a bronze medal in the women's street competition at the 2020 Summer Olympics held in Tokyo, Japan.

Skateboarding career
Nakayama competed in the 2018 Japan Skateboarding Championships at Murasaki Park Tokyo on May 13, 2018 in Tokyo, Japan. Nakayama competed in the finals at the Street League Skateboarding Tour - London in 2019. She finished in 6th place.  She entered the finals as the number one qualifier.  She had similar results three weeks later in Long Beach, California.  She entered that contest off of a second place in the street qualifier.  As of June 2019, she is ranked #8 in the world.

She is participating in the Dew Tour.

References

2005 births
Living people
Female skateboarders
Japanese skateboarders
Japanese sportswomen
Medalists at the 2020 Summer Olympics
Olympic bronze medalists for Japan
Olympic medalists in skateboarding
Olympic skateboarders of Japan
Skateboarders at the 2020 Summer Olympics
21st-century Japanese women